Oak Park Township is one of 29 townships in Cook County, Illinois and its boundaries are coterminous with the village of Oak Park. As of the 2010 census, its population was 51,878.

Adjacent townships

 Leyden Township (northwest)
 River Forest Township (west)
 Proviso Township (west)
 Berwyn Township (south)
 Cicero Township (southeast)

References

External links 
 

Townships in Cook County, Illinois
Townships in Illinois

eo:Oak Park